Daniel Paris (born 15 June 1973) is an Australian actor and photographer. He is best known for playing the role of Drew Kirk in the Australian soap opera Neighbours.

Personal life 
Paris was born in Perth, Western Australia and was raised in Esperance in Western Australia. His family moved in 1980 when he was 7 from the Perth suburb of Greenwood, to the coastal town of Esperance where he now resides with his partner and children.

Over the years, Paris competed in various triathlons. From 1990 to 1994, he was a surf lifesaver and won the under-21 state medal in surfboat competition. In 1991 he competed with the WA swim team, and in 1998 Paris was Sports Person of the Year (swimming) in State Country Region WA. 
In 1993, Paris received his degree in accounting from Edith Cowan University in Western Australia and briefly worked for a major Australian finance company.

Actor and presenter 
Paris was best known for his first acting role in 1998 as Drew Kirk in the Australian soap opera Neighbours. Kirk was killed off in 2002 and Paris continued on with various roles in MDA and McLeod's Daughters until 2005.
His career successfully crossed over as an advertising host for Aqua Technics and Ashley Martin, and more recently, as a presenter on Postcards, DestinationWA, ZoomTV, Home in WA, The West Real Estate Program and WA Weekender.

Paris has hosted various natural history documentaries, and in 2007 and 2009 was a regular presenter on the travel program Postcards WA.

Paris plays Mark Davies in the ABC/Matchbox television series The Heights.

Photographer and videographer 
Paris is also a freelance photographer and cinematographer, operating both Dan Paris Photography and Bauhaus Films video production.

References

External links
 
 
 Dan Paris bio as a presenter for Zoomtv

1973 births
Australian male television actors
Living people
Photographers from Western Australia
People from Esperance, Western Australia